The Northern Ontario Secondary Schools Athletic Association (NOSSAA) is the governing body for all secondary-school athletic competition in Greater Sudbury, North Bay, Sault Ste. Marie and the North Shore.

Mandate 
The NOSSA mandate is to establish a closer relationship among the member schools of the Association and to encourage and promote sound interscholastic athletic competition among the students of the secondary schools of the member districts.

Representation 
NOSSAA champions typically represent the region of northeastern Ontario in Ontario Federation of School Athletic Associations (OFSAA) competitions.

History 
The first NOSSAA Championship was in 1923, when North Bay Collegiate was crowned NOSSAA football champions.

Progression 
 School wins SDSSAA championship: Advances to NOSSAA
 School wins NOSSA championship: Advances to OFSAA

References 

Educational organizations based in Ontario